The final of the 2008–09 DFB-Pokal season was held on 30 May 2009 at the Olympiastadion, Berlin. Werder Bremen won with a 58th-minute goal from midfielder Mesut Özil. This was the club's sixth DFB-Pokal in its history, after victories in 1961, 1991, 1994, 1999 and 2004. This was Bayer Leverkusen's second DFB-Pokal final loss of the decade, the other occurring in 2002. Werder Bremen lost the 2009 UEFA Cup final ten days prior to the DFB-Pokal final, losing to Ukrainian side Shakhtar Donetsk.

Route to the final
The DFB-Pokal began with 64 teams in a single-elimination knockout cup competition. There were a total of five rounds leading up to the final. Teams were drawn against each other, and the winner after 90 minutes would advance. If still tied, 30 minutes of extra time was played. If the score was still level, a penalty shoot-out was used to determine the winner.

Note: In all results below, the score of the finalist is given first (H: home; A: away).

Match

Details

References

External links
 Match report at kicker.de 
 Match report at WorldFootball.net
 Match report at Fussballdaten.de 

2009
2008–09 in German football cups
Bayer 04 Leverkusen matches
SV Werder Bremen matches
Football competitions in Berlin
2009 in Berlin
May 2009 sports events in Europe